Umberto Ravetta (Venice, 22 December 1884 – Senigallia, 26 January 1965) was an Italian bishop and choir conductor.

Life 
Born in Venice, Ravetta was ordained as a priest on 25 July 1909 by cardinal Aristide Cavallari. He was a good musician and he led the Cappella Marciana from 1921 to 1926.
He was elected bishop of Senigallia on 14 November 1938. He attended the first two sessions of the Second Vatican Council until his death on 26 January 1965.

Compositions 
Ave Maris Stella

References

1884 births
1965 deaths
20th-century composers
20th-century musicologists
Cappella Marciana composers
Clergy from Venice